A Third Testament was a Canadian documentary television miniseries which aired on CBC Television from 1974 to 1975. A book based on the series was published subsequent to the broadcast.

Premise
This documentary series was presented by Malcolm Muggeridge and concerned Christian religious faith. The series discussed the lives of Augustine of Hippo, Blaise Pascal, William Blake, Søren Kierkegaard, Leo Tolstoy and Dietrich Bonhoeffer. Muggeridge proposed that the combined works of these people had in effect created a "Third Testament".

Production
The series was jointly produced by the CBC, Toronto company Nielsen-Ferns and Time-Life Films, with English and French language editions developed. Location filming was conducted in Europe and northern Africa. Original music for the series was composed and performed by Canadian composer John Mills-Cockell.

The series was produced in both French and English versions.

Scheduling
Six hour-long episodes aired Wednesdays at 9:30 p.m. (Eastern) from 13 November to 18 December 1974. The series was rebroadcast 31 July to 4 September 1975.

References

External links
 
 

CBC Television original programming
1974 Canadian television series debuts
1975 Canadian television series endings